Dusky flycatcher may refer to:

 American dusky flycatcher
 African dusky flycatcher